118 II also known as (要要发 II) ran for 218 episode drama series produced by Mediacorp Channel 8. It stars Chew Chor Meng, Pan Lingling, Dennis Chew, Ya Hui, Xu Bin, Somaline Ang, Jeanette Aw, Elvin Ng, Bryan Wong and Ha Yu as the cast of the second series.

The show replaced the second half of the 7.00 pm drama timeslot, airing weekdays from November 29, 2016, 7.30 pm to 8.00 pm on weekdays making it the 4th long form half an hour drama and it is 1st drama having 2 seasons also airing together with news-current affairs programme Hello Singapore at 6.30pm.

Cast

Hong (Daming) Family

Zhang (Tiancheng) Family

Li (Weiliang) Family

Li (Jinlong) Family

Liu (Dagong) Family
{| class="wikitable"
|-
!style="background:#A62925; color:#e1b971;width:17%" | Cast 
!style="background:#A62925; color:#e1b971;width:17%" | Role 
!style="background:#A62925; color:#e1b971;width:46%" | Description 
!style="background:#A62925; color:#e1b971;width:20% | Episodes Appeared
|-
| Zhu Houren  朱厚任 || Liu Dagong  刘大功 || 
 Dua Gong, Alexander Lau, Old Liar/ Swinder (老骗子)
Liu Dali's 2nd elder brother
Liu Jizhou, Liu Yazhou and Liu Junjie's paternal 2nd uncle 
Liu Jiejie ex-classmate and love interest
Zhang Tiancheng's rival in love
Ah Feng's husband
Na Na's brother-in-law
|| 8-11, 14, 23, 26, 28-29, 31-32, 36, 43, 47-53, 57-58, 61-62, 65-67, 71, 73-75, 80-81, 84, 91-92, 94-96, 99-100, 108, 110-111, 113, 115-116, 121, 123, 125, 128-129, 132-133, 136, 141-142, 146, 151, 154, 157, 160, 162-164, 167, 172, 174-176, 178, 180-182, 184, 186, 189, 192, 195-200, 203, 207, 211, 213-214, 216-218
|-
| Huang Jinrong  黄景蓉|| Ah Feng  阿凤 || 
Liu Dagong's wife
Liu Dali's sister-in-law
Dementia patient
|| 31, 43, 81, 213
|-
| Brandon Wong  黄炯耀 || Liu Dali  刘大利 || 
 Dua Liap, Ernest Lau 
Mentally Unstable
Liu Dagong's younger brother
Liu Jizhou and Liu Yazhou's paternal 3rd uncle 
Ah Feng's brother-in-law
Na Na's husband
Liu Junjie's father 
Zhang Meiyou's rival in love
|| 8-11, 14, 23, 26, 28, 31-32, 36, 43, 47-53, 57, 61-62, 65-66, 71, 74, 80-81, 84, 91-92, 94, 110, 113, 115-116, 121, 123, 125, 128-129, 132-133, 141-142, 150-151, 157, 160, 162-164, 167, 172, 174-175, 178, 180-182, 186, 189, 192, 195-196, 198-200, 206-207, 211, 216-218
|-
| Caryn Cheng  荘微霓 || Na Na  娜娜 ||
Liu Dali's Vietnamese wife
Liu Junjie's mother
Liu Dagong's sister-in-law
Zhang Meiyou's love interest
|| 115, 123, 125, 133, 139-140, 145, 148-149, 155, 162-164, 167, 172, 180-182, 186, 189, 206-209, 217-218
|-
| Bryan Wong  王禄江 || Liu Jizhou  刘际洲 || Property Agent  Chicken Congee (鸡粥), Soursop (红毛榴莲), Keep-Away-From-Him (闲人免进)"'
Liu Yazhou's elder brother
Liu Dagong and Liu Dali's nephew
Hong Daming and Liu Meimei's neighbour 
Hong Shunshui's best friend
Zhang Ke'ai, Li Jinlong and Li Taimei's tenant
Li Taimei's husband (married in Episode 218)
Li Jinlong and Shangguan Yan's son-in-law
Liu Junjie's cousin
|| 1-3, 6-8, 10, 12-17, 19-20, 22-28, 31-34, 36, 39-42, 44, 50-52, 54-56, 59-60, 62-64, 66-67, 71-73, 76-77, 82-83, 88-92, 94-96, 100-103, 109-110, 114-116, 119-123, 125-126, 128-131, 133-135, 138-139, 143, 146, 149-151, 153-155, 157-161, 166-168, 170-171, 173-176, 178-179, 181-187, 189, 191-192, 194-196, 198, 200, 202-203, 208-209, 211, 214, 216-218
|-
| Jeremy Chan  田铭耀 || Liu Yazhou  刘亚洲 || Villain but repented  Duck Porridge (鸭粥), Jerk (小混蛋), Greedy Monster (化骨龙), Asia Lau, Con Artist (骗子)Liu Jizhou's younger brother
Liu Dagong and Liu Dali's nephew 
Tang Yiyi's ex-boyfriend
Wang Yuye's ex boyfriend
Zhang Zhenhui's rival in love
Liu Junjie's cousin
Li Taimei's brother-in-law
|| 1, 25-28, 30, 33, 39-41, 44-47, 50-52, 55-57, 62-64, 67-68, 72-74, 76-83, 88-92, 95-98, 103-105, 108-109, 111, 117, 120-121, 123, 125-126, 130, 132, 138, 142-146, 149-151, 155, 159-161, 166, 169-171, 173-176
|-
| Perez Tay  郑传峻 || Liu Junjie  刘俊杰 || Ah Boy (阿Boy)Liu Dali and Na Na's son
Liu Dagong's nephew
Liu Jizhou and Liu Yazhou's cousin
|| 115, 123, 125, 130-131, 133, 139-140, 142, 148, 155, 163-164, 172, 186, 198-199, 201, 208, 217
|}

Zhang (Meiyou) Family

Deng (Bo) Family

Other characters

Cameo appearances

Marketing
Various roadshows to promote the series were done country wide.

The first roadshow was held at Compass One on 19 November 2016 with artistes Chew Chor Meng, Pan Lingling, Elvin Ng, Ya Hui, Dennis Chew, Xu Bin, Sora Ma, Chen Tianwen, Zhu Houren, Brandon Wong and Jeanette Aw. A second roadshow was held at Bedok Point on 17 December 2016 with artistes Bryan Wong, Pan Lingling, Carrie Wong, Zhang Yaodong, Dennis Chew, Somaline Ang, Sheila Sim, Nick Teo, Li Feihui, Cavin Soh and Liu Lingling.

The third roadshow was held at Bishan North Shopping Mall on 19 February 2017 with artist Ya Hui, Carrie Wong, Hayley Woo, Somaline Ang, Pan Lingling, Sheila Sim, Chew Chor Meng, Elvin Ng, Brandon Wong, Zhu Houren & Bryan Wong with Bishan North Minister Mrs Josephine Teo. The fourth roadshow was held at OneKM Mall on 29 April 2017 with artist Bryan Wong, Carrie Wong, Desmond Ng &Brandon Wong. The fifth roadshow was held at OneKM Mall on 30 April 2017 with artists Pan Lingling, Chen Tianwen, Elvin Ng, Ya Hui, Somaline Ang, Nick Teo, Sora Ma and Jeremy Chan.

Awards & Nominations
Star Awards 2018118 II ''' is up for 2 nominations as Life Less Ordinary.

Original Sound Track

References

2016 Singaporean television series debuts
2017 Singaporean television series endings
Singapore Chinese dramas
Singaporean comedy television series
Channel 8 (Singapore) original programming